Alfred Higgs (born 31 December, 1991) is a Bahamian sprinter from Freeport, Bahamas who competed in the 100m and 200. He attended Tabernacle Baptist High School in Freeport, Bahamas, before going on to compete for Iowa Central Community College and the University of South Florida. Higgs competed at the 2010 World Junior Championships in Athletics in Moncton, Canada and the 2015 IAAF World Relays in Nassau, Bahamas.

Personal bests

References

External links
 World Athletics
 USF Bio

1991 births
Living people
Bahamian male sprinters
People from Freeport, Bahamas
 University of South Florida alumni
Junior college men's track and field athletes in the United States
 Iowa Central Community College alumni

South Florida Bulls men's track and field athletes